Pune–Bengaluru Expressway is a planned green field, access-controlled expressway in Maharashtra and Karnataka. It is to be part of Bharatmala Pariyojana. The expressway will pass through 12 districts, of which three are in Maharashtra and nine are in Karnataka. It connects Pune with Bengaluru. The Bengaluru-Pune Expressway will reduce the distance between the two cities by about 95 km. Currently it takes about 13 hours to drive from Bengaluru to Pune but it's estimated to take as little as 7 hours after the completion of this expressway. At Pune, the expressway will also connect with the Pune–Mumbai Expressway. It is reported that the expressway is targeted to be completed by 2028.

This greenfield expressway under Bharatmala Pariyojna Phase 2 will run parallel to National Highway 48. Also, the Greenfield Expressway will serve as an alternative and faster route to the NH-48.

The proposed expressway, under Phase-II of the Prime Minister's flagship Bharatmala project, is estimated to be developed at a cost of Rs ₹50,000 crore.

Route

Maharashtra 
Pune–Bengaluru Expressway starts in Kanjle on proposed Pune ring road. It crosses Pune district, Satara district, Sangli district  in Maharashtra, and enters Karnataka state.

Karnataka 
This expressway passes through Belagavi, Bagalkot, Gadag, Koppal, Vijayanagara, Davanagere, Chitradurga, Tumakuru and Bengaluru Rural district in Karnataka. The expressway ends at Muthagadahalli on proposed Satellite ring road in Bengaluru Metropolitran Region.

See also
 Expressways in India

References

Expressways in Maharashtra
Expressways in Karnataka
Proposed expressways in India
Transport in Bangalore
Transport in Pune